The 2018–19 Croatian Football Cup was the twenty-eighth season of Croatia's football knockout competition. The defending champions were Dinamo Zagreb, having won their fifteenth title the previous year by defeating Hajduk Split in the final.

Calendar

Participating clubs
The following 48 teams qualified for the competition:

Preliminary round
The draw for the preliminary single-legged round was held on 1 August 2018 and the matches were played on 29 August 2018.

* Match played on 18 August.** Match played on 21 August.*** Matches played on 28 August.

First round
The draw for the first round was held on 31 August 2018 and the matches were played on 26 September 2018.

* Match played on 18 September.
** Match played on 19 September.
*** Matches played on 25 September.

Second round
The second round matches were played on 31 October 2018.

* Matches played on 30 October.

Quarter-finals
The quarter-final matches were played on 5 December 2018.

* Matches played on 4 December.

Semi-finals
Semi-final matches are scheduled for 24 April 2019.

Final

The final was played on 22 May 2019 at Stadion Aldo Drosina in Pula.

Bracket

Top scorers

References

External links
Official website 
Competition rules 

Croatian Football Cup seasons
Croatia
Croatian Cup, 2018-19